The Champion Jockey of flat racing in Ireland is the jockey who has ridden the most winning horses during a season. The list below shows the Champion Jockey for each year since 1950.

Champion Jockeys since 1950

 1950 - J W Thompson
 1951 - Jimmy Mullane
 1952 - Jimmy Mullane
 1953 - Liam Ward
 1954 - Jimmy Eddery
 1955 - Jimmy Eddery
 1956 - Liam Ward
 1957 - Liam Ward
 1958 - Liam Ward
 1959 - Liam Ward
 1960 - Garnet Bougoure
 1961 - Liam Ward
 1962 - Pat Glennon
 1963 - Johnny Roe
 1964 - Johnny Roe
 1965 - George McGrath
 1966 - Johnny Roe
 1967 - Johnny Roe
 1968 - Johnny Roe
 1969 - Buster Parnell
 1970 - George McGrath
 1971 - Johnny Roe
 1972 - Johnny Roe
 1973 - Johnny Roe
 1974 - Johnny Roe
 1975 - Christy Roche
 1976 - Wally Swinburn
 1977 - Wally Swinburn
 1978 - Tommy Murphy
 1979 - Christy Roche
 1980 - Christy Roche
 1981 - Christy Roche
 1982 - Pat Eddery
 1983 - Christy Roche
 1984 - Mick Kinane
 1985 - Mick Kinane
 1986 - Mick Kinane
 1987 - Mick Kinane
 1988 - Mick Kinane
 1989 - Mick Kinane
 1990 - Christy Roche
 1991 - Mick Kinane
 1992 - Mick Kinane
 1993 - Mick Kinane
 1994 - Mick Kinane
 1995 - Johnny Murtagh
 1996 - Johnny Murtagh
 1997 - Christy Roche
 1998 - Johnny Murtagh - 87
 1999 - Mick Kinane - 92
 2000 - Pat Smullen - 80
 2001 - Pat Smullen - 81
 2002 - Mick Kinane - 79
 2003 - Mick Kinane - 103
 2004 - Jamie Spencer - 93
 2005 - Pat Smullen - 67
 2006 - Declan McDonogh - 86
 2007 - Pat Smullen - 94
 2008 - Pat Smullen - 90
 2009 - Johnny Murtagh - 93
 2010 - Pat Smullen - 96
 2011 - Johnny Murtagh - 83
 2012 - Joseph O'Brien - 87
 2013 - Joseph O'Brien - 126
 2014 - Pat Smullen - 108
 2015 - Pat Smullen - 103
 2016 - Pat Smullen - 115
 2017 - Colin Keane - 100
 2018 - Donnacha O'Brien - 111
 2019 - Donnacha O'Brien - 111
 2020 - Colin Keane - 100
 2021 - Colin Keane - 141
 2022 - Colin Keane - 92

Records
Most titles - 13 - Michael Kinane
Most consecutive titles - 6 - Michael Kinane
Most wins in a season - 141 - Colin Keane

See also
 British flat racing Champion Jockey
 Irish jump racing Champion Jockey

References

Irish jockeys
Horse racing in Ireland
Champion jockeys